The 1969–70 Sheffield Shield season was the 68th season of the Sheffield Shield, the domestic first-class cricket competition of Australia. Victoria won the championship.

Table

Statistics

Most runs
Greg Chappell, 856

Most wickets
Alan Thomson, 49

References

Sheffield Shield
Sheffield Shield
Sheffield Shield seasons